Wheat Swamp is a  long 3rd order tributary to Contentnea Creek in Lenoir and Greene Counties, North Carolina.  This stream forms the boundary of Lenoir and Greene Counties, in part.

Variant names
According to the Geographic Names Information System, it has also been known historically as:
Wheat Swamp Creek

Course
Wheat Swamp rises about 2 miles northeast of Institute, North Carolina and then flows southeast and curves northeast to join Contentnea Creek about 0.5 miles northeast of Hookerton.

Watershed
Wheat Swamp drains  of area, receives about 49.8 in/year of precipitation, has a wetness index of 584.92, and is about 13% forested.

References

Rivers of North Carolina
Rivers of Greene County, North Carolina
Rivers of Lenoir County, North Carolina